The Renault DiET engine also known as "D engine" or "D-Type" is a straight-4 automobile petrol engine from Renault designed to replace the existing Cléon-Fonte engine in the Renault Twingo.

History 
The D Engine was designed because the 1.2-liter Energy Engine with its hemispherical cylinder head and exhaust up to the front of the head could not fit under the hood of the First generation Twingo.

In 1997, New pollution regulations went into effect. Renault could have kept the Cléon-Fonte 1.2 on the Twingo and its Energy engine 1.2 on the Clio, applying changes to its engines, such equipping multipoint injection, but rather than investing in two different engines and because of the unexpected success of Twingo, they decided to opt for a new engine that could both be mounted on the Twingo as the Clio, hence the creation of the D-Type Engine.

The D-Type engine has a hemispherical cylinder head incorporating the camshaft, with the exhaust placed at the back of the head in order to get under the hood of the First generation Twingo.

D7F
It had sequential multi-port fuel injection.

Applications:
 1996–2000 Renault Twingo
 1996–1998 Renault Clio I
 1998–2005 Renault Clio II (Clio Campus to 2008)
 1998 Renault Kangoo

D7D
The D7D was a  8V version.

Applications:
 1997–2007 Renault Clio
 1998 Renault Kangoo
 2000 to 2001 Renault Twingo

D4F
The D7F was succeeded by the D4F in December 2000. It was revised in 2004 (D4F-722) to receive better intake design with much larger air filter extending torque range from 3500rpm to 4250 rpm. D4F-740 variant received changes to camshaft and valve lifters to allow lower idle at 650 rpm and shorter 1st and 2nd gear to help with extra weight of new Clio III introduced in 2005. 

Applications:
 2000–2014 Renault Twingo
 2001–present Renault Clio
 2006–present Renault Symbol
 2004–2012 Renault Modus/Grand Modus
 2005–2011 Proton Savvy
 2009–2016 Dacia Logan
 2009–2016 Dacia Sandero

D4D
The D4D was a 16V  version.

Applications:
 1997–2001 Renault Clio
 1998 Renault Kangoo
 2000 to 2001 Renault Twingo
 2001 to 2005 Peugeot 206 in Brazil with motor 1.0
 2000 to 2016 Renault Clio, Renault Sandero and Renault Logan in Brazil with motor 1.0 Flex Fuel (Alcohol and Gasoline at same time)
 2011 to 2015 Nissan March in Brazil (made in Mexico or made in Brazil) with motor 1.0 Flex Fuel (Alcohol and Gasoline at same time)

D4FT
In an effort to produce a cost-effective fuel efficient engine Renault introduced a turbocharged version of the D4F, the D4FT, in 2007. Renault named it the 1.2 TCE (Turbo Control Efficiency).

Renault created the break by suggesting downsizing on petrol engines, with the range of TCe engines (Turbo Control efficiency). TCe engine - TCe 100, the best  petrol engine due to its driving pleasure and moderate fuel consumption thanks to high and instant low/midrange torque rather than high power near redline. The TCe petrol engine (Turbo Control efficiency) offers the power output of a 1.4L engine, the torque of a 1.6L engine and the fuel consumption almost of a 1.2L engine. It is responsive from low revs, flexible and has power in reserve while displaying the lowest fuel consumption figures for a  petrol engine. It emits only 137 g/Km of CO2 on Clio 3 and 140 g/km of CO2 on Modus and the Twingo GT.

These unique qualities are obtained thanks to the combination of a 1.2L capacity engine with a low inertia low boost pressure turbocharger whose response time is reduced to the minimum, through the use of a turbine and a small diameter compressor.

The turbocharger includes an "overpower" feature which temporarily boosts power output in 2nd, 3rd and 4th gears at engine speeds of more than 4,500 rpm ( extra power and  extra torque).

It is fitted to the following vehicles:

 2007–2014 Renault Twingo
 2007–present Renault Clio
 2007–2012 Renault Modus
 2010–2013 Renault Wind

D
D
Gasoline engines by model
Straight-four engines